TRIGA (Training, Research, Isotopes, General Atomics) is a class of nuclear research reactor designed and manufactured by General Atomics. The design team for TRIGA, which included Edward Teller, was led by the physicist Freeman Dyson.

Design

TRIGA is a swimming pool reactor that can be installed without a containment building, and is designed for research and testing use by scientific institutions and universities for purposes such as undergraduate and graduate education, private commercial research, non-destructive testing and isotope production.

The TRIGA reactor uses uranium zirconium hydride (UZrH) fuel, which has a large, prompt negative fuel temperature coefficient of reactivity, meaning that as the temperature of the core increases, the reactivity rapidly decreases. Because of this unique feature, it has been safely pulsed at a power of up to 22,000 megawatts.  The hydrogen in the fuel is bound in the uranium zirconium hydride crystal structure with a vibrational energy of 0.14eV. When the core is hot, these levels fill and transfer energy to any cooler neutrons making them hot and, therefore, less reactive. TRIGA was originally designed to be fueled with highly enriched uranium, but in 1978 the US Department of Energy launched its Reduced Enrichment for Research Test Reactors program, which promoted reactor conversion to low-enriched uranium fuel.

History

The TRIGA was developed to be a reactor that, in the words of Edward Teller, "could be given to a bunch of high school children to play with without any fear that they would get hurt." Teller headed a group of young nuclear physicists in San Diego in the summer of 1956 to design an inherently safe reactor which could not, by its design, suffer from a meltdown. The design was largely the suggestion of Freeman Dyson. The prototype for the TRIGA nuclear reactor (TRIGA Mark I) was commissioned on 3 May 1958 on the General Atomics campus in San Diego and operated until shut down in 1997. It has been designated as a nuclear historic landmark by the American Nuclear Society.

Mark II, Mark III and other variants of the TRIGA design have subsequently been produced, and a total of 33 TRIGA reactors have been installed at locations across the United States.  Those that remain operational continue to be upgraded/modernized. A further 33 reactors have been installed in other countries. Many of these installations were prompted by US President Eisenhower's 1953 Atoms for Peace policy, which sought to extend access to nuclear physics to countries in the American sphere of influence. Consequently, TRIGA reactors can be found in a total of 24 countries, including Austria, Bangladesh, Brazil, Congo, Colombia, England, Finland, Germany, Taiwan, Japan, South Korea, Italy, Indonesia, Malaysia, Mexico, Morocco, Philippines, Puerto Rico, Romania, Slovenia, Thailand, Turkey, and Vietnam.

TRIGA International, a joint venture between General Atomics and  — then a subsidiary of AREVA of France — was established in 1996. Since then, all TRIGA fuel assemblies have been manufactured at CERCA's plant in Romans-sur-Isère, France.

Some of the main competitors to General Atomics in the supply of research reactors are Korea Atomic Energy Research Institute (KAERI) of Korea and INVAP of Argentina.

The TRIGA Power System (TPS) is a proposed small power plant and heat source, based upon the TRIGA reactor and its unique uranium zirconium hydride fuel, with a power output of 64 MWth / 16 MWe.

See also 
 List of commercial nuclear reactors
 List of nuclear research reactors
 Hydrogen-moderated self-regulating nuclear power module

Notes

References

External links
 General Atomics official TRIGA website

Triga
Nuclear technology in the United States
Atoms for Peace
Freeman Dyson
1956 in technology
1956 introductions
1958 in California